The 1947 World Professional Basketball Tournament was the 9th edition of the World Professional Basketball Tournament. It was held in Chicago, Illinois, during the days of 7-11 April 1947 and featured 14 teams. It was won by the Indianapolis Kautskys who defeated the Toledo Jeeps 62–47 in the title game. The Fort Wayne Zollner Pistons came in third after beating the Oshkosh All-Stars 86–67 in the third-place game behind Ralph Hamilton's 26 points. Julie Rivlin of the Toledo Jeeps was named the tournaments Most Valuable Player.

Results

First round
April 7 - Oshkosh All-Stars 60, Herkimer Mohawk Redskins 54
April 7 - Anderson Duffey Packers 59, Pittsburgh Pirates 38
April 7 - Midland Dow Chemicals 71, Syracuse Nationals 39
April 8 - Sheboygan Redskins 62, Portland Indians 48
April 8 - Toledo Jeeps 62, New York Rens 59
April 8 - Tri-Cities BlackHawks 57, Baltimore Bullets 46

Bracket

Third place game

Championship game

Individual awards

All-Tournament First team
C - Arnie Risen, Indianapolis Kautskys
F - Leo Klier, Indianapolis Kautskys 
F - Ralph Hamilton, Fort Wayne Zollner Pistons
G - Julie Rivlin, Toledo Jeeps (MVP)
G - Herm Schaefer, Indianapolis Kautskys

All-Tournament Second team
C - Jake Pelkington, Fort Wayne Zollner Pistons
F - Paul Cloyd, Midland Dow Chemicals 
F - Hal Tidrick , Toledo Jeeps
G - Billy Hassett, Tri-Cities BlackHawks
G - George Sobek, Toledo Jeeps

References

External links
WPBT 1939-48 on apbr.org

World Professional Basketball Tournament